Soyosan Station is a ground-level metro station on Line 1 of the Seoul Subway in Sangbongam Dong, Dongducheon, South Korea. It is named after the nearby Soyosan (587 m), a mountain beside the U.S. Army base Camp Casey. It is on this mountain, at the Jajae'am Hermitage, that the Buddhist Saint Wonhyo is said to have reached enlightenment.

History
The station opened for business on January 11, 1976, and the station building was completed on September 21, 1982. This building was closed twenty-four years later, on May 7, 2006, and a temporary building erected in its place. Meanwhile, Line 1 of the Seoul Subway was being extended north through the city of Dongducheon, and Soyosan became its northern terminus, with a new station building completed, on December 15, 2006.

Platform

Passenger Statistics

Exit

Photos

References

External links
VisitKorea article on Soyosan
Trainspotters society page on Soyosan Station

Seoul Metropolitan Subway stations
Railway stations in Gyeonggi Province
Railway stations opened in 1975
Metro stations in Dongducheon
Gyeongwon Line
Seoul Subway Line 1